Sironia, Texas is a novel by American author Madison Cooper that describes life in the fictional town of Sironia, Texas, in the early 20th century. The book won the Houghton Mifflin Literary Award. Sironia is widely thought to be a thinly disguised version of Cooper's hometown of Waco, Texas. The book contains over 1,700 pages, making it one of the longest novels in the English language. Written over a period of 11 years, it was published in 1952. It sold 25,000 copies in its initial printing, but quickly faded from public view. Cooper subtly satirized upper-class southerners throughout the book.

Synopsis
Follows the fortunes and failures of the citizens of Sironia, Texas in the early years of the 20th century. Though just a young child at the story's beginning, Tam Lipscomb, the son of a prosperous merchant, will go on to become the novel's central character. Also covered are the lives of the "Hill Families" (the Thaxtons, Storrows and Hadyns), Sironia's version of royalty and three branches of the old Reardon family tree. Likewise the town's black folk are followed in their own triumphs and defeats; they experience success in family life and also bitter racism due to interracial marriage.

References

1952 American novels
Novels set in Texas
Houghton Mifflin books